The Yeni Mosque (from , "New Mosque") is an Ottoman mosque in the Greek town of Komotini dating back to 1585. It is the only surviving structure in Greece to feature Iznik tiles from the 1580s, the zenith of the Iznik potters' art. The mosque is located in the center of Komotini, adjacent to the Muftiate of Rhodope Prefecture. Next to the Mosque is the Clock Tower and the Ottoman Turkish baths are found in neighboring areas. Ironically, the New Mosque was built before the Old Mosque of 1608.

History 
Its founding is attributed to Ekmekçizade Ahmed Pasha who was the chief finance minister (defterdar) in 1606-1613 of Sultan Ahmed I and of Osman II (1618-1622). The külliye of Ekmekçizade Ahmed included a medrese, a double Turkish bath (now in ruins) and a mektep. The current form of the mosque dates back to 1902. The mosque has a square prayer hall and has been architecturally influenced by the aesthetics of Greek neoclassicism.  In the period 2007–8, the building was refurbished. It is in active service as a place of Muslim worship, serving the large Muslim community of Komotini (Gümülcine in Turkish).

See also 
 Defterdar Mosque (Kos)
 Islam in Greece

Sources 
 

Ottoman Thrace
Buildings and structures in Komotini
Ottoman mosques in Greece
16th-century mosques
Mosque buildings with domes